The 2019 FIBA Under-17 Women's Oceania Championship is an international under-17 basketball tournament held from 19 to 24 August 2019 by FIBA Oceania in Nouméa, New Caledonia. Australia were the defending champions and they successfully defended their title after defeating New Zealand in the final, 88–41.

Hosts Selection
On 23 September 2016, FIBA Oceania announced during their Board Meeting that New Caledonia was to host the tournament.

Participating teams

Group Phase
All times are in UTC+11:00

Group A

Group B

Final round

Classification 7th-8th

Playoffs

Classification 5th-6th

Semifinals

Bronze medal game

Final

Final standings

Awards
The All-Star Five were announced on 25 August 2019.

References

External links 
 FIBA Oceania U-17 Championship for Women

2018–19 in Oceanian basketball
2018 in New Caledonian sport
2017
Basketball in New Caledonia
August 2019 sports events in Oceania
International sports competitions hosted by New Caledonia